Muhammad Muslehuddin Siddiqui (27 December 1918 – 23 March 1983) (Urdu محمد مصلح الدین صدیقى), was a preacher born in Nanded on India's Deccan Plateau.

Education
Under the supervision of his father Ghulam Jilani, he memorised the Quran. On the suggestion of Muhammad Abdul Aziz Muhaddis Mubarakpuri, in 1935 at the age of 17 years he went to Darul-uloom Ashrafiya in Mubarakpur Azamgarh Uttar Pradesh, where he studied fiqh, hadith and other Islamic subjects. After 8 years at this university, he travelled with Abdul Azeez Mubarakpuri in 1943 to Nagpur.

Sadrush Sharia and entered Qari Muslehuddin in his Bay'ah during 1358 AH. At the age of 29, in 1946, Muhammad Amjad Ali Azami conferred khilafah upon him thus giving him permission to speak on behalf of the Qadri Order.

Pakistan Movement
During the Pakistan Movement, Siddiqui was among the scholars who sided with Muhammad Ali Jinnah and the Muslim League, on the platform of "All India Sunni Conference" held at Banaras in 1946.

Migration to Pakistan
Siddiqui later went back to Karachi and joined his previously left position of Khatib in Akhond Masjid situated in Kharadar, soon after this he was requested to join Khori Garden Masjid situated at Jodia Bazar. He also corresponded with "Madarsa Qadriya" located in Baghdad to send many Pakistani students for higher studies.

Death
On the 7th day of Jumada al-Thani 1403 AH, corresponding to 23 March 1983, at noon, he felt ill, and died in the ambulance en route to the hospital due to a heart attack at the age of 67 years.

See also
Ahmad Raza Khan
Hamid Raza Khan
Ilyas Attar Qadri
Jamaat Ahle Sunnat
Mustafa Raza Khan

References

External links
27th Urs of Muhammad Muslehuddin Siddiqui Qadri Razavi
Short Biography of Muhammad Muslehuddin in Urdu Language
Speeches by Muhammad Muslehuddin Siddiqui Qadri Razavi
Qasida Bura Shareef recitation by Muhammad Muslehuddin Siddiqui Qadri Razavi

1918 births
1983 deaths
Hanafis
Scholars from Hyderabad, India
People from Karachi
Pakistani Sufis
Pakistani Sunni Muslim scholars of Islam
Qadiri order
Pakistani people of Hyderabadi descent
Barelvis